Yolanda Lastra de Suárez (born 1932) is a Mexican linguist specializing in the descriptive linguistics of the indigenous languages of Mexico. She obtained her PhD degree in 1963 from Cornell University, her dissertation written under the guidance of Charles F. Hockett treating the syntax of Cochabamba Quechua in Bolivia. She was married to Argentinian linguist Jorge A. Suárez (1927-1985).

Lastra has worked with linguistic documentation and dialectology of the Nahuatl and Otomi languages and is recognized as a leading authority in the studies of Oto-Pamean languages in general. Her 1986 book Áreas dialectales del Náhuatl moderno is the single most comprehensive work on the dialectology of modern Nahuatl ever published.

Lastra is currently a senior investigator at the Institute of Anthropology at Universidad Nacional Autonoma de México. Since May 2014 she is a full member of the Academia Mexicana de la Lengua, the Mexican Language Academy.

Partial bibliography
Lastra's published works include:

References

External sources

External links
 

Mexican Mesoamericanists
Women Mesoamericanists
Cornell University alumni
1932 births
Linguists from Mexico
20th-century Mesoamericanists
Living people
Linguists of Mesoamerican languages
Linguists of Uto-Aztecan languages
Linguists of Oto-Manguean languages